Douglas Wayne Owens (May 2, 1937 – December 18, 2002) was an American politician and a member of the United States House of Representatives for Utah's 2nd congressional district from 1973 to 1975 and again from 1987 to 1993.

Career
Born and raised in the small town of Panguitch, Utah, Owens graduated from Panguitch High School in 1955, then attended the University of Utah in Salt Lake City, from which he earned his Bachelor's degree in 1961 and his Juris Doctor in 1964. Owens' undergraduate education was interrupted while he served as missionary to France for the Church of Jesus Christ of Latter-day Saints (LDS church) from 1957 to 1960. In France, he met his future wife, Marlene, a fellow missionary for the church. Owens worked his way through college and law school through working various jobs, including being a night-watchman at the Beehive House. He then worked as a lawyer in private practice and as a staffer for three United States Senators, Frank Moss of Utah, Robert F. Kennedy of New York, and Edward M. Kennedy of Massachusetts. He was the Western states coordinator for the presidential campaigns of Robert Kennedy in 1968 and Edward Kennedy in 1980, and served as a delegate to the Democratic National Convention in 1968 and 1980.

In 1972, he was elected to the U.S. House of Representatives as a Democrat by "walking for Congress" throughout the district to meet voters personally. He unseated incumbent Republican Sherman P. Lloyd with 55% of the vote.  During that period, he sat on the House Judiciary Committee which voted for the articles of impeachment of President Richard M. Nixon.

He ran an unsuccessful U.S. Senate campaign against Jake Garn in 1974, then served as a mission president of the LDS Canada Montreal Mission from 1975 to 1978, after which he returned to Salt Lake City to practice law. In 1984, Owens lost the Utah gubernatorial race to Republican Norman H. Bangerter, but was re-elected to the House in 1986 and served through 1992, when he ran for the U.S. Senate again. That year, he was defeated by a wider margin than expected by Bob Bennett. Owens was embarrassed that year by his involvement in the so-called House banking scandal,.  Owens was cleared by the House Ethics Committee of any wrong-doing, as the "scandal" was essentially generous overdraft protection and no taxpayer money was ever at risk.  Owens was attacked for his "liberal" voting record, which his supporters contended actually was liberal only by the standard of conservative Utah politics. Following his Senate defeat, he retired to semi-private life but remained a tireless proponent for the causes he had championed in the U.S. Congress.

Throughout his congressional career, Owens was a friend to environmentalists (he would later serve on the boards of several environmental organizations within the state), an advocate for "downwinders" who had suffered radiation exposure during atomic testing in Nevada in the 1950s, a strong supporter of the Central Utah Project to bring much-needed water to the region, and founder of the Center for Middle East Peace and Economic Cooperation. He always considered his vote, along with the votes of his fellow freshman congressmen, to force the vote that ended the Vietnam War to be one of the highlights of his career.

Personal life
After serving as a congressman, Owens was selected as a LDS Mission President and served as such for a three year tenure in the Montreal mission in Canada 1975 to 1978.

He was the founder and representative of the Institute of Middle Eastern Peace in Israel.

On December 18, 2002, Owens suffered a fatal heart attack in Tel Aviv, Israel while on a trip to further the cause of Middle East peace.

In the 2014 and 2016 congressional elections, Wayne Owens' son, Doug Owens, ran for election to Utah's 4th congressional district. He was defeated by Republican candidate Mia Love in both of his runs.

References

External links
Directory of the United States Congress, 1774–Present
The Center for Middle East Peace & Economic Cooperation
The Center for Middle East Peace & Economic Cooperation — : Wayne Owens, 1937–2002
Hinckley Institute of Politics Hall of Fame

1937 births
2002 deaths
20th-century Mormon missionaries
American leaders of the Church of Jesus Christ of Latter-day Saints
American Mormon missionaries in Canada
Mission presidents (LDS Church)
People from Panguitch, Utah
Politicians from Salt Lake City
University of Utah alumni
Utah lawyers
Burials at Salt Lake City Cemetery
American Mormon missionaries in France
Democratic Party members of the United States House of Representatives from Utah
S.J. Quinney College of Law alumni
20th-century American politicians
Latter Day Saints from Utah
20th-century American lawyers